State of Siege: 26/11 is an Indian Hindi-language action thriller web series on ZEE5, directed by Matthew Leutwyler and Prashant Singh and produced by Abhimanyu Singh and Roopali Singh. The series is based on journalist Sandip Unnithan's book Black Tornado: The Three Sieges of Mumbai 26/11 about the military's Operation Black Tornado during the 26/11 terrorist attacks. The series features Arjan Bajwa, Arjun Bijlani, Jyoti Gauba, Vivek Dahiya, Tara Alisha Berry Mukul Dev and Naren Kumar  in prominent roles. The series was launched on 20 March 2020 on ZEE5.

Plot
The series depicts the terrorist attacks from the lens of NSG Commandos who were called in to save the day during the 26/11 terrorist attacks after the Mumbai Police suffered major casualties.

Cast
Arjan Bajwa as Col. Kunal Sahota
Digvijay Purohit as Lt. Col. Aniruddh Das
Arjun Bijlani as Maj. Nikhil Manikrishnan
Vivek Dahiya as  Capt. Rohit Bagga
Mukul Dev as Zakiur Rehman Lakhvi
Avinash Wadhawan as J.C.P. Sidana
Naren Kumar as Babar Imran
Ashwin Patil as Nazeer
Karan Singh Chahhbra as Nasir
Abhishek Goyal as Javed
Akash Makhija as Shoaib
Abhishek Mahendru as Hafiz
Shoaib Kabeer as Ajmal Kasab
Sonu Randeep Chaudhary as Ismail
Sid Makkar as Sontosh Dutta
Tara Alisha Berry as Parvati Patil
Suzanne Bernert as Yocheved Orpaz
Imran Nazir Khan as Brogon

Episodes

Release
The trailer of the series was released on 26 February 2020 and later-on the web series was premiered on 20 March 2020 on ZEE5.

Reception
Pallavi Pahwa from Firstpost stated "State of Siege: 26/11 is the first such series that looks at the 26/11 attacks from the NSG Commandos perspective and how they managed to neutralize the terrorists and their plans." Jyoti Kanyal from India Today briefly stated "State of Siege 26/11 will remind you of all the documentaries, films and shows based on the Mumbai terror attacks, but what is unique about this show is that it narrates the story from the perspective of the NSG."

Arushi Jain from The Indian Express summarizes her take stating "State of Siege 26/11 gives you a stirring visual account of the 2008 Mumbai attacks and compels you to keep watching." Udita Jhunjhunwala from Scroll.in wrote "State of Siege is less about the victims and their trauma and more about the men with the guns and power." 
The rediff.com's Joginder Tuteja wrote, it leaves you shocked and wide-eyed and also succeeds in uncovering the various sides of the story during the siege. PINKVILLA's Bhavna Aggarwal wrote, State of Siege: 26/11 is an unapologetic & REAL portrayal of Mumbai attack.

Spin-Off 
State of Siege: Temple Attack (2021) is a next installment to State of Siege: 26/11. It stars Akshaye Khanna and is directed by Ken Ghosh. It is based on the 2002 Akshardham Temple attack in Gujarat.

References

External links
 
 State Of Siege: 26/11 on ZEE5

2020 web series debuts
Indian military television series
War television series
ZEE5 original programming
Works based on the 2008 Mumbai attacks
Indian action television series
Indian web series
Hindi-language web series
Indian thriller television series
Television series based on actual events
Television series based on books
Works about jihadism
Works about Islamic terrorism
Terrorism in television
Television shows set in Mumbai
Television series set in 2008